The Parc des Oiseaux is a zoological park located in Villars-les-Dombes in the department of Ain in France. It is one of the oldest ornithological parks in France and brings together a collection of more than 3,000 birds from around the world in a  reserve located in the heart of the Dombes. The section opened to the public covers an area of  within the reserve and welcomes on average 250,000 visitors per year.

Operation of the park
Three hundred bird species are represented at the Parc des Oiseaux. These represent a collection of 3,000 birds from all continents.

References

Aviaries